Weishanzhuang Town is a town situated in the center of Daxing District, Beijing, China. It borders Huangcun Town in the north, Qingyundian and Anding Towns in the east, Lixian Town in the south, Panggezhuang Town and Tiangongyuan Subdistrict in the west. As of 2020, it was home to 46,661 people.

History

Administrative divisions 
By 2021, Weishanzhuang Town consisted of 39 villages:

Gallery

See also 

 List of township-level divisions of Beijing

References 

Towns in Beijing
Daxing District